Polyommatus (Agrodiaetus) ninae, or Nina's blue, is a butterfly of the family Lycaenidae described by Walter Forster in 1956. It is found in Armenia, Azerbaijan, Georgia, eastern Turkey, and northern Iran (Kurdistan).

The wingspan is 28–30 mm. The species inhabits calcareous grasslands and arid mountain steppes, usually dominated by legumes. In Armenia Nina's blue occupies an elevation range from 1500 to 2300 m above sea level. The flight period in Armenia is mainly from late July to late August.

The larvae feed on the Astragalus species A. brachycarpus and A. subrobustus.

References

External links

 Butterfly Conservation Armenia

ninae
Butterflies described in 1956